The Pop PHP Framework a free and open source PHP Web framework that was created by Nick Sagona. It is distributed under the BSD License and hosted on GitHub. The framework is intended to be utilized for rapid application development, with an emphasis on web applications.

History 

Development on the Pop PHP Framework was officially begun by Nick Sagona in late 2011, when he refactored a set of older library components into the first version of Pop PHP, which was released on March 19, 2012. The focus was for Pop PHP to become a more modern, MVC-style web framework with a set of supporting components to assist in building web applications.

After PHP 5.4 was released, Pop PHP 2 was refactored to take advantage of the new features available in PHP 5.4, as well as fully leveraging Composer by breaking out almost all of the components into separate repositories on GitHub. Pop PHP 2 was first released on July 12, 2015.

Pop PHP 3 was a slight refactor of the existing framework, while adding a handful of new components and deprecating a few older components. Version 3 supports PHP 7 and 5.6 and was released on July 9, 2016. The last version, 3.8.0, was released on August 25, 2018. The EOL version 3.8.9 was released on February 24, 2020.

Pop PHP 4 was another refactor of the existing framework that upgraded and improved existing components. The current version, 4.7.0, supports PHP 8, with backwards compatibility for PHP 7.4. Version 4.7.0 was released on November 16, 2022.

The framework has been included on a number of "best of" lists for new and up-and-coming PHP Frameworks.

The Pop PHP Framework is the framework on which the open source Phire CMS project was built.

Release history

Version 4.7.0 is the current version that is in active development. Versions 3 and earlier have reached end of life and are no longer supported. A current changelog is maintained for a recent list of changes and how they impact continued development with Pop PHP.

Source: GitHub

Development 

While the initial development of the Pop PHP Framework was focused on building web applications, since version 3, Pop PHP fully supports console-based applications to be used on the CLI as well. Pop PHP incorporates current standards, trends and patterns in software development in an attempt to build an ecosystem that is familiar to developers. The framework is heavily unit-tested using PHPUnit and runs through the GitHub Actions workflow platform to ensure the builds of the individual framework components are passing.

Pop PHP 4.7.0 is currently written for and supports PHP 8, with backward compatibility for PHP 7.4.

The Pop PHP Framework project welcomes community involvement and contribution via the current available channels.

Features 

The base foundation of Pop PHP is the initial set of core components that make up the application stack:

 The Application Object
 The Router
 The Service Locator
 The Event Manager
 The Module Manager
 The Base Controller Class

Additionally, there are a number of other components that are available for use in building an application. Some of the commonly used components and what they include are:

 Database Abstraction (popphp/pop-db)
 Database adapters
 Active record
 Query builder
 SQL migration
 HTTP Abstraction (popphp/pop-http)
 Request & response handlers
 HTTP clients
 File uploads
 HTML Form Generation (popphp/pop-form)
 HTML Form Validation
 PDF Generation (popphp/pop-pdf)
 PDF Creation
 Job Queue (popphp/pop-queue)
 Job Queue Management & Scheduler
 Mail (popphp/pop-mail)
 SMTP support
 Mail queues
 IMAP/POP client
 Auditing (popphp/pop-audit)
 Caching (popphp/pop-cache)
 Debugging (popphp/pop-debug)
 Logging (popphp/pop-log)
 Image Manipulation (popphp/pop-image)
 Views (popphp/pop-view)
 Sessions (popphp/pop-session)
 Cookies (popphp/pop-cookie)

Popcorn 

Popcorn is a standalone web-based component that serves as a REST-based micro-framework layer to allow developers to quickly build REST-based web applications and APIs. With it, a developer can enforce routes by request methods and direct HTTP requests accordingly.

Kettle 

Kettle is a CLI-based helper script available since version 4.0.1. It allows the user to quickly scaffold application files and folders together as well as manage databases and migrations.

References

External links 
 Official Website

Free software programmed in PHP
PHP frameworks
Web frameworks
Software using the BSD license